The Fédération Ivoirienne du Scoutisme Féminin (Ivory Coast Federation of Female Scouting) is the national Guiding organization of Côte d'Ivoire. It serves 1,900 members (as of 2008). Founded in 1937, the girls-only organization became a full member of the World Association of Girl Guides and Girl Scouts in 1963.

Members of the federation are:
 Guides catholiques de Cote d'Ivoire
 Eclaireuses laïques de Cote d'Ivoire
 Eclaireuses unionistes de Côte d'Ivoire

See also
 Fédération Ivoirienne du Scoutisme

References

World Association of Girl Guides and Girl Scouts member organizations
Scouting and Guiding in Ivory Coast
Youth organizations established in 1937